The Samuel J. Tipton House, near Harris, Kansas, dates from 1857.  It was listed on the National Register of Historic Places in 1975.

The house, also called Mineral Point Mansion, was built for Samuel J. Tipton, who introduced Shorthorn cattle to Kansas.  The house served as a post office, as a general store, and as a stage-stop.

References

Houses on the National Register of Historic Places in Kansas
Houses completed in 1857
Anderson County, Kansas